Willingdon-Two Hills was a provincial electoral district in Alberta, Canada, mandated to return a single member to the Legislative Assembly of Alberta using the first past the post method of voting from 1963 to 1971.

History
Willingdon-Two Hills was formed from the abolished Willingdon riding expanded south in 1963 when Vegreville  merged with Bruce, to form Vegreville-Bruce. Due to the expanded boundaries the riding name was changed to Willingdon-Two Hills.

Willingdon-Two Hills was dissolved following the 1971 electoral district re-distribution, and the territory was incorporated into Vegreville and Redwater-Andrew electoral districts.

Willingdon-Two Hills is named for the former town of Willingdon, Alberta and town of Two Hills, Alberta.

Members of the Legislative Assembly (MLAs)

Electoral history

1963 general election

1967 general election

See also
List of Alberta provincial electoral districts
Willingdon, Alberta, a hamlet in Alberta
Two Hills, Alberta, a town in Alberta

References

Further reading

External links
Elections Alberta
The Legislative Assembly of Alberta

Former provincial electoral districts of Alberta